"Secrets" is a song recorded by American recording artist Mary Lambert. Lambert co-wrote the song with MoZella and the song's producers, Eric Rosse and Benny Cassette; B.o.B contributed his own verse to the featured version. It was released July 15, 2014 through Capitol Records as the lead single from Lambert's debut major-label album, Heart on My Sleeve (2014). A remix featuring American hip hop artist B.o.B was released August 19, 2014.

Content
"Secrets" is primarily a pop song, but also draws on elements of hip hop in Lambert's "sing-talk" delivery and B.o.B's rap verse. It is composed in the key of C major and is set to a moderate tempo of approximately 93 BPM. The song features confessional lyrics based on Lambert's real-life insecurities, ranging from dysfunctional family situations to her homosexuality, with an overarching message of acceptance and self-empowerment.

Chart performance
"Secrets" debuted at number 39 on the Billboard Adult Pop Songs chart dated August 2, 2014. It debuted at number 92 on the Billboard Hot 100 for the week ending September 20, 2014.

Weekly charts

Year-end charts

Release history

See also
 List of number-one dance singles of 2014 (U.S.)

References

2014 songs
2014 singles
B.o.B songs
Capitol Records singles
LGBT-related songs
Songs written by Eric Rosse
Songs written by B.o.B
Songs written by Mozella
Songs with feminist themes
Songs written by Benny Cassette